José Miguel Antúnez Melero (born February 21, 1967 in Madrid, Spain) is a retired Spanish professional basketball player.

Professional career
Antúnez was a member of the FIBA European Selection team, in 1995.

Spain national team
Antúnez played in 45 games, with the senior Spain national basketball team. They won a bronze medal at the 1991 EuroBasket.

Awards and accomplishments
Spanish League Champion (2): 1992–93, 1993–94
Spanish Cup Winner (1): 1992–93
EuroLeague Champion (1): 1994–95
FIBA Saporta Cup Champion (1): 1991–92

References
FIBA Profile
FIBA Europe Profile
Spanish ACB League Profile 

1967 births
Living people
Baloncesto Fuenlabrada players
CB Breogán players
CB Estudiantes players
CB Granada players
Liga ACB players
Point guards
Real Madrid Baloncesto players
S.L. Benfica basketball players
Spanish expatriate basketball people in France
Spanish men's basketball players
1990 FIBA World Championship players
Basketball players from Madrid
STB Le Havre players
1994 FIBA World Championship players